Jim Willis was a Negro league pitcher in the 1920s and 1930s.

Willis made his Negro leagues debut in 1926 with the New Orleans Algiers. In 1929, he joined the Nashville Elite Giants, and spent the majority of his career with the club, as it moved from Nashville to Cleveland, Columbus, Washington, and finally Baltimore, where Willis finished his career in 1939.

References

External links
 and Seamheads

Place of birth missing
Place of death missing
Year of birth missing
Year of death missing
Baltimore Elite Giants players
Birmingham Black Barons players
Cleveland Cubs players
Columbus Elite Giants players
Nashville Elite Giants players
New Orleans Algiers players
Philadelphia Stars players
Washington Elite Giants players